The North American Aviation T-6 Texan is an American single-engined advanced trainer aircraft used to train pilots of the United States Army Air Forces (USAAF), United States Navy, Royal Air Force, Royal Canadian Air Force and other air forces of the British Commonwealth during World War II and into the 1970s. Designed by North American Aviation, the T-6 is known by a variety of designations depending on the model and operating air force. The United States Army Air Corps (USAAC) and USAAF designated it as the AT-6, the United States Navy the SNJ, and British Commonwealth air forces the Harvard, the name by which it is best known outside the US. Starting in 1948, the new United States Air Force (USAF) designated it the T-6, with the USN following in 1962. It remains a popular warbird used for airshow demonstrations and static displays. It has also been used many times to simulate various historical aircraft, including the Japanese Mitsubishi A6M Zero. A total of 15,495 T-6s of all variants were built.

Development

The Texan's ancestry goes back to the North American NA-16 prototype which was first flown on April 1, 1935. In 1935, NAA submitted this design for the U.S. Army Air Corps Basic Trainer Competition. NAA also targeted the export market.

Modified as the NA-26, it was submitted as an entry for a USAAC "Basic Combat Trainer " aircraft competition in March 1937. Based on the NA-18, but with a foot longer wingspan, it was the first of the NA-16 series with retractable gear. It was similar to the BT-9, but with a larger engine, the  Pratt & Whitney R-1340 Wasp, and could accommodate two  guns. 

With minor alterations, 177 unarmed NA-36s would enter service as the BC-1 with a R-1340-47 engine from 9 June 1937. Roughly 30 were modified as BC-1-I instrument trainers. 
The BC-1A (NA-55-1) followed as an armed version, primarily for Air Corps Reserve and National Guard units, and the 83 built could be equipped with a  machine gun on the nose, and a flexible gun in the rear cockpit.

The US Navy received 40 NA-28 aircraft based on the BT-9, which it designated the NJ-1, as well as 16 NA-52s, designated the SNJ-1, 36 NA-65 as SNJ-2s, and 25 NA-79 also as SNJ-2s.

In March 1937, the Commonwealth Aircraft Corporation of Australia purchased an NA-32 (NA-16-1A, with fixed undercarriage) and an NA-33 (NA-16-2K with retractible undercarriage) along with a manufacturing license. The first CAC Wirraway, based on the NA-33, flew on 27 March 1939, of which 755 were built.

In August 1937, Mitsubishi Jukogyo K.K. purchased a single NA-16, NA-16-4R (NA-37), powered by the  Pratt & Whitney R-985-9CG, including manufacturing rights. A second N-16, NA-16-4RW (NA-47), powered by a smaller Wright engine, was ordered in December 1937. After being evaluated by the Imperial Japanese Navy, Kyusu and K.K. Watanabe Tekkosho chose to ignore the NAA design almost entirely, and built 176 of the somewhat similar K10W1 from 1941 to 1942 which the Allies gave the code name Oak.
After WWII, the Japanese Air Self Defense Force operated 195 Texans (9 T-6Ds, 11 T-6Fs, and 175 T-6Gs) and the Japanese Maritime Self Defence Force operated 62 (10 SNJ-4s, 41 SNJ-5s, and 11 SNJ-6s)

According to Dan Hagedorn, "the BC-1A series may be regarded as the true beginning of the modern AT-6 series." In December 1938, the British Commonwealth started receiving the first of 400 Harvard Mark Is (NA-49), for use in the Central Flying School. They were powered by the  Pratt & Whitney R-1340-S3H1 Wasp. In May 1939, the Royal Canadian Air Force (RCAF) ordered 30 Harvard Mark Is (NA-61). Then in November 1939, the British Purchasing Commission ordered the first of eventually 1275 Harvard Mark IIs (NA-66, NA-75, NA-76, and NA-81) for the Royal Air Force and RCAF.

On 23 April 1939, NAA received a contract for 251 BT-14s and 94 AT-6s. The BT-14 (NA-58) was a fixed gear aircraft with a metal skinned fuselage 14 inches longer than the BT-9. In 1941, 27 BT-14s were refitted with the  R-985-11, and designated as BT-14A-NAs. In June 1939, NAA received an order for 94 AT-6-NAs (NA-59), powered by the wright R-1340-47 and able to mount two  machines guns.

The USAAC AT-6A, and the U.S. Navy SNJ-3, were based on the NA-77 and NA-78 designs. Pratt & Whitney R-1340-49 Wasp radial engine powered the USAAC aircraft, while R-1340-38s powered the Navy aircraft. The USAAC received 1847 AT-6As, and the Navy received 270 SNJ-3s.

The AT-6B (NA-84) was built for armament training, and could mount a  machine gun on the right nose cowl, right wing, and in the rear cockpit, and could carry a light bomb rack. The aircraft was powered by the  R-1340-AN-1 engine. The USAAC received 400.

The NA-88 design was used to build 2970 AT-6Cs (747 of which went to the British Commonwealth as Harvard IIas), 2401 SNJ-4s, 2604 AT-6Ds (537 of which went to the British Commonwealth as Harvard IIIs), and 1357 SNJ-5s. The first AT-6C aircraft was delivered on 12 February 1942. The 12-volt electrical system was changed to a 24-volt system in the AT-6D, for standardization amongst the service. The AT-6D, which was also armament capable, and early versions included a wing gun camera, and a high-pressure oxygen system. The AT-6D used two toggle starter switches, rather than the foot pedal starter, and the first AT-6D was delivered on 22 July 1943. The Navy received an additional 630 AT-6Ds direct from the USAAF, redesignating them SNJ-5s, for a total of 1987. Similarly, the NA-121 design was used to build the final wartime Texans, and included 800 AT-6Ds (of which 211 went to the Navy as SNJ-5s), and 956 AT-6Fs (of which 411 went to the Navy as SNJ-6s). They were capable of carrying a  centerline drop tank.

From 1942, Canada's Noorduyn built 2557 R-1340-AN-1-powered Harvard IIs under license, paid for by USAAF Lend-Lease funds as the AT-16, but designated as the Harvard II.B. After WWII, many remained in service with the RCAF.

The NA-168 series consisted of remanufactured AT-6s and SNJs for the USAF, starting in 1949. The Air Training Command received 641 aircraft, designated T-6G-NT, of which 416 eventually were sent to U.S. Military Assistance Program countries. U.S. National Guard units received an additional 50 aircraft, of which 28 eventually were sent to France. An additional 59 aircraft were Liaison/Trainer aircraft, designated LT-6G-NA, for the Korean War. These aircraft could be deployed with 2 detachable  machine gun pods, and 4 HVARs, or 4  bombs, plus a  auxiliary drop tank. Alternatively, they could carry the gun pods and 12  SCA markings rockets, or 6  bombs. The T-6G-NAs had a  fuel capacity, while previous models had a  capacity. The rear cockpit also had the same instruments as the front cockpit. Then, in 1951, the USAF placed an order for 824 T-6Gs, designated T-6G-1-NH, for the Air Training Command.

The Canada Car and Foundry built 285 Harvard 4s, designated NA-186 under the Mutual Defense Assistance Program (MDAP) and an additional 270 directly for the RCAF.

In April 1951, the USAF ordered an additional 107 T-6Gs for the MDAP, designated NA-188. They placed an order for 11 training aircraft in March 1952, designated NA-195, and then a final batch of 110 aircraft in June for MDAP, designated NA-197.

Operational history

Combat use
The British used Harvards during World War II in North Africa, but not in a combat role. They were used extensively for preparing pilots in theatre for flying US aircraft types, whose handling and controls differed from British aircraft. 

74 OTU formed in RAF Aqir in Palestine from ‘C’ Flight of 71 OTU who made various moves to Rayak in July 1942, Muqeibila in November 1942, and back to Aqir in February 1943. The RAF later handed over control to No. 203 Group RAF in May 1943. The unit disbanded in July 1945. Harvard AJ841 "Wacky Wabbit" – AJ 841 saw service with No. 154 Squadron RAF. Originally 154 Squadron were based just at RAF Fowlmere before they were deployed to the Middle East in 1942. Record cards for 154 Squadron show the squadron Harvard being flown by Flying Officer DC Dunn from Minnigh (Syria) to Ramat David (Palestine) on 12 February 1944.

Peru used its seven T-6 fighter bombers in the Ecuadorian-Peruvian War equipped with two  guns, while carrying up to four  bombs. Twenty AT-6s were employed by the 1st and 2nd fighter squadrons of the Syrian Air Force in the 1948 Arab-Israeli War, providing ground support for Syrian troops, and launching airstrikes against Israeli airfields, ships, and columns, losing one aircraft to antiaircraft fire. They also engaged in air-to-air combat on a number of occasions, with a rear gunner shooting down an Israeli Avia S-199 fighter.

The Israeli Air Force (IAF) bought 17 Harvards, and operated nine of them in the final stages of the 1948 Arab-Israeli War, against the Egyptian ground forces, with no losses. In the Sinai Campaign, IAF Harvards attacked Egyptian ground forces in Sinai Peninsula with two losses.

The Royal Hellenic Air Force employed three squadrons of British- and American-supplied T-6D and G Texans for close air support, observation, and artillery spotting duties during the Greek Civil War, providing extensive support to the Greek army during the Battle of Gramos. Communist guerillas called these aircraft "O Galatas" ("The Milkman"), because they saw them flying very early in the morning. After the "Milkmen", the guerillas waited for the armed Spitfires and Helldivers.

During the Korean War and, to a lesser extent, the Vietnam War, T-6s were pressed into service as forward air control aircraft. These aircraft were designated T-6 "Mosquitos".

No. 1340 Flight RAF used the Harvard in Kenya against the Mau Mau in the 1950s, where they operated with  bombs and machine guns against the rebels. A Harvard was the longest-serving RAF aircraft, with an example, taken on strength in 1945, still serving in the 1990s (as a chase plane for helicopter test flights—a role for which the Shorts Tucano's higher stall speed was ill-suited).

The T-6G was also used in a light attack or counterinsurgency role by France during the Algerian War in special Escadrilles d'Aviation Légère d'Appui (EALA), armed with machine guns, bombs and rockets. At its peak, 38 EALAs were active. The largest unit was the Groupe d'Aviation Légère d'Appui 72, which consisted of up to 21 EALAs.

From 1961 to 1975, Portugal used more than a hundred T-6Gs, also in the counterinsurgency role, during the Portuguese Colonial War. During this war, almost all the Portuguese Air Force bases and air fields in Angola, Mozambique, and Portuguese Guinea had a detachment of T-6Gs.

On 16 June 1955, rebel Argentine Navy SNJ-4s bombed Plaza de Mayo in Buenos Aires, Argentina; one was shot down by a loyalist Gloster Meteor. Navy SNJ-4s were later used by the colorado rebels in the 1963 Argentine Navy Revolt, launching attacks on the 8th Tank Regiment columns on 2 and 3 April, knocking out several M4 Sherman tanks, and losing one SNJ to anti-aircraft fire.

In 1957–58, the Spanish Air Force used T-6s as counterinsurgency aircraft in the Ifni War, armed with machine guns, iron bombs, and rockets, achieving an excellent reputation due to its reliability, safety record, and resistance to damage.

The Pakistan Air Force used T-6Gs in the Indo-Pakistani War of 1971 as a night ground-support aircraft, hitting soft transport vehicles of the Indian army. In the early hours of 5 December, during a convoy interdiction mission in the same area, Squadron Leader Israr Quresh's T-6G Harvard was hit by Indian antiaircraft ground fire and a shell fractured the pilot's right arm. Profusely bleeding, the pilot flew the aircraft back with his left hand and landed safely. The World War II-vintage propellered trainers were pressed into service and performed satisfactorily in the assigned role of convoy escorters at night.

The South African Air Force received their first T-6s in October 1942 to be used by the Joint Air Training Scheme. By July 1944, 633 Harvard Mk IIA T-6s and IIIs had been shipped to South Africa with another 555 (379 MkIIAs and 176 Mk IIIs) to arrive by October 1945. Another 65 (AT-6Ds and 30 T-6Gs) were ordered between 1952-1956. The aircraft also saw some action during the South African Border war. The T-6 remained in service until 1995 as a basic trainer, mainly as a result of the United Nations arms embargo against South Africa's apartheid policies. They were replaced by Pilatus PC-7 MkII turboprop trainers.

Research testbed
The Harvard 4 has been used in Canada as a testbed aircraft for evaluating cockpit attitude displays. Its aerobatic capability permits the instructor pilot to maneuver the aircraft into unusual attitudes, then turn the craft over to an evaluator pilot in the "blind" rear cockpit to recover, based on one of several digitally generated attitude displays.

Variants

Operators

 Argentine Army Aviation (SNJ-4)
 Argentine Naval Aviation (SNJ-4 and 30 SNJ-5Cs for carrier operations)

 Austrian Air Force

 Belgian Air Force

 Biafran Air Force

 Bolivian Air Force
 Naval Aviation

 Brazilian Air Force

 Royal Khmer Aviation (AVRK)

 Royal Canadian Air Force
 Royal Canadian Navy
 National Research Council (still in use)

 Republic of China Air Force

 Chilean Air Force

 Colombian Air Force

 Congolese Air Force

 Cuban Air and Air Defense Force

 Royal Danish Air Force

 Dominican Air Force

 Air Force of El Salvador

 French Air Force

 Gabon Air Force

 German Air Force (Bundeswehr Luftwaffe)

 Hellenic Air Force

Haitian Air Corps

 Royal Hong Kong Auxiliary Air Force

 Honduran Air Force

 Royal Indian Air Force
 Indian Air Force

 Indonesian Air Force – bought 25 from the United States.

 Iranian Air Force

 Iraqi Air Force - bought 15 aircraft in the early 1950s; 6 of them were donated to Lebanon in 1956.

 Israeli Air Force

 Italian Air Force operated 238 aircraft from 1949 until 1979

 Japan Air Self-Defense Force
 Japan Maritime Self-Defense Force

Force Aérienne Katangaise

 Lebanese Air Force

 Republic of Korea Air Force
 Kingdom of Laos
 Royal Lao Air Force

 Mexican Air Force Total of 120 delivered, 47 AT-6 and 73 T-6C

 Royal Moroccan Air Force

 Royal Netherlands Air Force
 Dutch Naval Aviation Service
 Royal Netherlands East Indies Army Air Force – Post war

 Mozambique Air and Air Defense Forces

 Royal New Zealand Air Force (1 maintained for historic flight)
 New Zealand Territorial Air Force

 Royal Norwegian Air Force (1 maintained for historic flight)

 Fuerza Aérea de Nicaragua (G.N) Escuela Militar de Aviación 1948-1979

 Pakistan Air Force

 Paraguayan Air Force
 Paraguayan Naval Aviation

Philippine Air Force

 Portuguese Air Force
 Portuguese Naval Aviation

 South African Air Force

 Southern Rhodesian Air Force

 Republic of Vietnam Air Force

 Royal Saudi Air Force

 Spanish Air Force

 Soviet Air Forces

 Swedish Air Force 145 Harvard IIb as Sk 16A, 106 T-6A, T-6B, SNJ-3, SNJ-4 as Sk 16B and 6 SNJ-2 as Sk 16C.

 Swiss Air Force

 Syrian Air Force

 Royal Thai Air Force
 Royal Thai Navy

 Tunisian Air Force

Turkish Air Force: 196 planes of various types

 Royal Air Force
 Royal Navy
 Qinetiq (retired in 2016)

 United States Army Air Corps/Army Air Forces
 United States Air Force
 United States Navy
 United States Marine Corps
 United States Coast Guard

 Uruguayan Air Force
 Aviacion Naval Uruguaya

 Venezuelan Air Force
 Kingdom of Yemen
 Yemeni Air Force

 SFR Yugoslav Air Force

Specifications (T-6G)

In popular culture

In the September 1944 issue of The Sportsman Pilot, USAAF Capt. Paul K. Jones' article stated, "The Six is a plane that can do anything a fighter can do—and even more. Naturally not as fast, she makes up for speed in her ease of handling and her maneuverability. She's a war machine, yes, but more than that she's a flyer's airplane. Rolls, Immelmans, loops, spins, snaps, vertical rolls—she can do anything—and do it beautifully. For actual combat, more guns, more speed and more power is needed. But for the sheer joy of flying—give me an AT-6."

After World War II, the National Air Races established a unique racing class for the AT-6/Texan/Harvard aircraft; this class continues today at the Reno National Air Races each year.

Since the Second World War, the T-6 has been a regular participant at air shows, and was used in many movies and television programs. For example, converted single-seat T-6s painted in Japanese markings to represent Mitsubishi Zeros made appearances in A Yank in the R.A.F. (1941), Tora! Tora! Tora! (1970), Baa Baa Black Sheep (1976-1978), and The Final Countdown (1980). In A Bridge too Far (1977) it represented the razorback Republic P-47 Thunderbolt. Some were modified for the Dutch film Soldaat van Oranje (1977) to represent the Dutch pre–World War II fighter Fokker D.XXI.

The T-6 had a major role in the Pat Benatar music video for the song "Shadows of the Night". It was also used for a backdrop on the album cover of the 1978 Black Sabbath album Never Say Die!

The New Zealand Warbirds "Roaring 40s" aerobatic team use ex–Royal New Zealand Air Force Harvards. The Flying Lions Aerobatic Team uses Harvards acquired from the South African Air Force.

See also

References

Bibliography
 Becker, Dave and Brent, Winston. AT-6 Harvard in South African Service (African Aviation Series No.1). Nelspruit, South Africa:, Freeworld Publications CC, 2000. .
 Bergèse, Francis. North American T-6 (in French). Rennes, France: Ouest France, 1979. .

 Davis, Larry. T-6 Texan in Action (Aircraft Number 94). Carrollton, TX: Squadron/Signal Publications, Inc., 1989. .
 Donald, David. American Warplanes of World War II. London:Aerospace Publishing, 1995. .
 Fletcher, David C. and MacPhail, Doug. Harvard! the North American Trainers in Canada. San Josef, BC/Dundee, Ont: DCF Flying Books, 1990. .
 .
 Hamlin, John F. The Harvard File. Tonbridge, Kent, UK: Air-Britain (Historians) Ltd., 1988. .
 Jesse. William. T-6 Texan, the Immortal Pilot Trainer. London: Osprey Publishing Ltd., 1991. .
 Kohn, Leo J. The Story of the Texan (American Flight Manuals). Aviation Publications Co., 1975. .
 MacPhail, Doug and Östberg, Mikael. Triple Crown BT-9: The ASJA/Saab Sk 14, A Pictorial Essay (in English/Swedish). San Josef, BC/Dundee, Ont: DCF Flying Books, 2003.
 Marchand, Patrick and Takamori, Junko. North American T-6 et derivés (in French). Le Muy, France: Editions d'Along, 2004. .
 Morgan, Len. Famous Aircraft Series: The AT-6 Harvard. New York: Arco Publishing Co., 1965.

 Olrich, Walter and Ethell, Jeffrey L. Pilot maker; the Incredible T-6. North Branch, MN: Specialty Press, 1982. .

 Smith, Peter Charles. North American T-6: SNJ, Harvard and Wirraway. Ramsbury, Marlborough, Wiltshire, UK: The Crowood Press Ltd., 2000. .
 Smith, Peter Charles. T-6: The Harvard, Texan & Wirraway – A Pictorial Record. North Branch, MN: Speciality Press, 1995. .

 Spring, Ivan and Rivers, Reg. Colour schemes and special markings of the North American "Harvard" in service with the SAAF 1940 to 1995. Pretoria, SOuth Africa: Spring Air Publishers, 1996. .
 Starkings, Peter. From American Acorn to Japanese Oak – The tale of an unsung Japanese training aircraft with roots extending across the Pacific Ocean. Arawasi International, Asahi Process, September–December 2007, Issue 7.
 Swanborough, Gordon and Bowers, Peter M. United States Military Aircraft since 1909. London:Putnam, 1963.

 Wache, Siegfried. CCF Harvard Mk. IV (T-6) (series F-40 – Die Flugzeuge der Bundeswehr Nr.09) (in German). Buchholz, Germany: Buchholz Medien Verlag, 1989. .

External links

 Warbird Alley: T-6/SNJ/Harvard page – History, photos, specs, and links
 Texan, Harvard & SNJ Registry – Lists approximately 1,200 extant T-6's by serial number
 The Canadian Harvard Aircraft Association
 Backgrounder on the Harvard 4 (includes photographs)
 AT-6: School Marm With an Attitude (pilot report)
"A Yank at Grantham: First North American "Basic" Trainer Delivered to the R.A.F. : The Harvard Described"Flight 1939 
T.O. TT-6C-2 Handbook Erection and Maintenance Instructions T-6, -6A, 6B USAF Model T-6C, T-6D Navy Models SNJ-3, SNJ-4, SNJ-5, SNJ-6 (1956)
Pacific Warbirds: North American SNJ  – History, restoration, service & more

T-06 Texan
1930s United States military trainer aircraft
World War II trainer aircraft of the United States
Single-engined tractor aircraft
Low-wing aircraft
Aircraft first flown in 1935